Tenggerese (sometimes referred to as Tengger Javanese) is a language used by the Tenggerese people in the mountain region of the Bromo Tengger Semeru National Park which includes Pasuruan Regency, Probolinggo Regency, Malang Regency and Lumajang Regency of East Java, Indonesia.

Linguistically, Tenggerese is considered to be a dialect of Javanese, a Malayo-Polynesian language under the Austronesian language family. Some linguists regard Tenggerese as a descendant of the ancient Kawi language, as it has retained old vocabulary that is no longer used in modern Javanese.

Distribution
Tenggerese is spoken in regions that are settled by the Tenggerese people in the Bromo Tengger Semeru National Park area:
 Tosari, Pasuruan Regency
 Sakapura district, Probolinggo Regency
 Ngadas village, Poncokusomo district, Malang Regency
 Ranu Pani village, Senduro district, Lumajang Regency

Grammar
A few examples of words in Tenggerese:

When the alphabet "A" is read as "O" in modern Javanese, in Tenggerese it is still read as "A".

References

Bibliography

 
 

Javanese language
Languages of Indonesia